Chiang Wai Hung (Chinese: 蔣 偉洪; born 15 April 1976) is an Hong Kong sprinter. He competed in the 100 metres at the 2000 Summer Olympics and the 2004 Summer Olympics.

References

External links
 

1976 births
Living people
Athletes (track and field) at the 2000 Summer Olympics
Athletes (track and field) at the 2004 Summer Olympics
Hong Kong male sprinters
Olympic athletes of Hong Kong
Place of birth missing (living people)
Athletes (track and field) at the 1998 Asian Games
Athletes (track and field) at the 2002 Asian Games
Athletes (track and field) at the 2006 Asian Games
Asian Games competitors for Hong Kong